KREW (1400 AM) is a radio station licensed in Plainview, Texas.  The station airs a news/talk/sports format and is owned by Monte Spearman and Gentry Todd Spearman, through licensee High Plains Radio Network, LLC.

After the launch of 1090/1590 The Hub in 2015, some of the weekday talkshows airing on 1090 KVOP moved to 1400 KREW.  The shows that moved include Lynn Woolley, weekdays 8a-11a; Rush Limbaugh, weekdays 11a-2p; Dave Ramsey, weekdays 2p-4p.

References

External links

REW
Sports radio stations in the United States